The Type 97 Torpedo (97式短魚雷, 97 Shiki Tan Gyorai) is a short-range torpedo developed and built by the Mitsubishi Heavy Industries for the Japanese Maritime Self Defense Force. This type of torpedo, like many other modern Japanese weapons systems, is not exported.

Development
At the end of the Cold War, Soviet attack submarines were capable of moving at higher speed and diving at lower depth, rendering the torpedoes used by US navy and the JMSDF, like the Mk-46 torpedo, less able to deal with them. So a new type of torpedo needed to be developed.

The US launched a new type of torpedo, the Mk-50 using an infrared detector and a closed-loop pump with an integrated processing unit for analyzing underwater sound waves for target acquisition. This type of torpedo can also be used to intercept other torpedoes. Soviet submarines, however, have developed adaptive capabilities, such as the use of trap baits and interference of the detection system, making it harder for the torpedo to find its target.

In 1989 a new torpedo project by Japan, G-RX4, was launched to develop the necessary upgrades and start making prototypes. By 1997 the new torpedo was approved and put into service and is called the Type 97. The torpedo is now equipped for P-3 ASW aircraft  and Mark 32 torpedo tubes on surface ships.

See also
 APR-3E torpedo - Russian equivalent
 A244-S - Italian equivalent
 Mark 54 Lightweight Torpedo - US Navy's equivalent
 MU90 Impact - French/Italian equivalent
 TAL Shyena - Indian equivalent
 Yu-7 torpedo - Chinese equivalent
 K745 Chung Sang Eo - South Korean equivalent
 Sting Ray (torpedo) - British equivalent

References

External links
 97式短魚雷
 防衛白書（画像）

Aerial torpedoes
Torpedoes of Japan